Kamloops North station is a railway station in Kamloops, British Columbia, Canada. It is on the Canadian National Railway mainline and is located at the Canadian National Railway Yards. The station is served by Via Rail's Canadian train.

Rocky Mountaineer trains call at the Kamloops station, not this station.

References

External links 
Via Rail Station Description

Via Rail stations in British Columbia
Buildings and structures in Kamloops